Jean-Michel Dupuis (born in 1955) is a French theatre, TV and film actor.

Filmography

Theater

External links 
 

1955 births
Living people
French male film actors
French male television actors
French male stage actors